Associazione Sportiva Dilettantistica Sport Club Nissa 1962, commonly known as Nissa, is an Italian association football club, based in Caltanissetta, Sicily.

History

Foundation 
The club was founded in 1962, as heir of former local club Unione Sportiva Nissena, who lived from 1947 to 1962, and assumed the original denomination of Nissa Sport Club 1962.

Serie D 
It initially played in minor amateur league before reaching Serie D in 1967, where it spent a total of five season before being relegated in 1972. It returned to play Serie D only in 1979, later starting plans for a historical enter into the world of Italian professional football. Nissa were however relegated in 1983, only to be readmitted to fill a league vacancy; it consequently decided to take advantage of the opportunity and build a strong team that promptly won the 1984 Serie D league, and finally ensuring promotion to Serie C2.

Serie C2 
Nissa's debut as a professional team came in a Coppa Italia Serie C match against Reggina, ended in a 2–2 home tie. In its first Serie C2 season, it barely escaped relegation by winning the four final matches. The following campaign was far more successful, as Nissa managed to achieve a good sixth place in the final place. However, Nissa's time into professional football came to an end in 1987, as it was relegated back to Interregionale. This was followed by a financial crisis that caused a relegation to Promozione in 1989; the club promptly returned to Interregionale the following season, but only to be canceled from football due to bankruptcy in 1992. A minor Promozione club, Caltanissetta, was consequently admitted to Eccellenza under the denomination of Nuova Nissa, being promoted to Serie D in 1995. However this club folded only three years later, in 1998, due to financial issues.

The refoundation 
After a year without a major football team in Caltanissetta, in 1999 minor clubs Sommatino and Nissena 1996 merged to found the current club, gaining the right to play Promozione, and immediately winning promotion to Eccellenza. In the following years, Nissa fought hard to go on its rise into the football pyramid, without succeeding in it until 2008, when it won the Girone A of Eccellenza Sicily after a long battle with Trapani.

Liquidation and another refoundation 
In summer 2013 the club was not able to enter 2013–14 Eccellenza, after the relegation and was so subsequently liquidated. In 2014 however, it restarted in Prima Categoria Sicily under the current name.

Colors and badge 
Its official colours are red and yellow.

Stadium 
Nissa currently plays its home games at the Stadio Palmintelli, the second-largest stadium in the city of Caltanissetta.

Until 2013, Nissa played their home matches at Stadio Marco Tomaselli, informally known as Pian del Lago, with a capacity of 11,950. This venue also hosted an Italy national under-21 football team match in 1994, which ended in a 2–1 win for the azzurrini against Croatia national under-21 football team, but is best remembered for seeing the Italian team play with Nissa's red-coloured home shirts due to both teams having very similar jersey colours and lacking the corresponding reserve kits.

References

External links 
Official site

Nissa
Nissa
Caltanissetta
Nissa
Nissa
Italian football clubs established in 1962